The High Street drill hall is a former military installation in Paisley, Scotland.

History
The building was designed by Thomas Graham Abercrombie as the headquarters of the 2nd Renfrewshire Rifle Volunteers and completed about 1896. This unit evolved into the 6th Battalion, the Princess Louise's (Argyll and Sutherland Highlanders) in 1908. The battalion was mobilised at the drill hall in August 1914 before being deployed to the Western Front. The 6th Battalion amalgamated with the 5th Battalion to form the 5th/6th Battalion in 1921. The building continued to be used as a drill hall until 1996. It was subsequently decommissioned and sold to the University of the West of Scotland for academic use.

On 11 March 2020, a fire broke out in the building causing extensive damage to the roof.

References

Drill halls in Scotland
Buildings and structures in Renfrewshire